Stranger in Town is the tenth studio album by American rock singer Bob Seger and his second with the Silver Bullet Band, released by Capitol Records in May 1978 (see 1978 in music). As with its predecessor, the Silver Bullet Band backed Seger on about half of the songs and the Muscle Shoals Rhythm Section backed Seger on the other half.

The album became an instant success in the United States, being certified platinum by the Recording Industry Association of America less than a month after the album's release, and, like its predecessor Night Moves, it would later go 6× Platinum. It was also his first album to chart in the UK, where limited editions were released on silver vinyl and in picture disc format as well as standard black vinyl.

Track listing

Notes
The Silver Bullet Band plays on side one tracks 1, 2, & 5 and on side two track 3

The Muscle Shoals Rhythm Section plays on side one tracks 3 & 4 and on side two tracks 1, 2, & 4

Personnel

Bob Seger – vocals, guitar, piano 
The Silver Bullet Band
Drew Abbott – guitar
Robyn Robbins – organ 
Alto Reed – saxophone
Chris Campbell – bass
David Teegarden – drums, percussion 
Muscle Shoals Rhythm Section
Barry Beckett – piano, organ 
Pete Carr – guitar
Jimmy Johnson – guitar
David Hood – bass
Roger Hawkins – drums, percussion

Additional musicians
Ken Bell – guitar on "Old Time Rock & Roll" 
Glenn Frey – guitar solo on "Till It Shines"
Don Felder – guitar solo on "Ain't Got No Money"
Bill Payne – piano, organ on "Hollywood Nights"
Doug Riley – piano on "Feel Like a Number" and "Brave Strangers"
Randy McCormick – piano on "Old Time Rock & Roll"
Howie McDonald – guitar solo on "Old Time Rock & Roll"

Background singers
"We've Got Tonite" and "Still the Same"
Venetta Fields – vocals, background vocals
Clydie King – vocals, background vocals
Sherlie Matthews – vocals, background vocals
"Hollywood Nights"
Julia Waters – background vocals
Luther Waters – vocals, background vocals
Maxine Waters – background vocals
Oren Waters – vocals, background vocals
"Brave Strangers"
Brandye – vocals, background vocals
"Old Time Rock & Roll"
James Lavell Easley – background vocals
Stanley Carter – background vocals
George Jackson – vocals, background vocals

Production

Producers: Punch Andrews, Bob Seger
Engineers: John Arrias, Mark Calice, David Cole, Hugh Davies, Gregg Hamm, Steve Melton, George Tutko
Mixing: Punch Andrews, John Arrias, Bob Seger
Mastering: Wally Traugott
Remastering: Punch Andrews, 1999
Remastering: Robert Vosgien 
String arrangements: Jim Ed Norman
Horn arrangements: Alto Reed 
Art direction: Roy Kohara
Design: Ken Anderson
Photography: Terrence Bert, Bob Siedemann

Charts

Album

Weekly charts

Year-end charts

Singles

Certifications

References

1978 albums
Bob Seger albums
Albums produced by Punch Andrews
Albums recorded at Muscle Shoals Sound Studio
Capitol Records albums